Christianese (or Christianeze) refers to the contained terms and jargon used within many of the branches and denominations of Christianity as a functional system of religious terminology. It is characterized by the use in everyday conversation of certain words, theological terms, puns and catchphrases, in ways that may be only comprehensible within the context of a particular Christian sect or denomination. The terms used do not necessarily come from the Bible itself. They may have come into use through discussions about doctrine, through the social history of the Christian church at large, or in the unique history of a specific denomination or movement.

In the developed Christian context, particular terms like God and Christ (or Jesus) as well as more common terms such as faith, truth and spirit have a rich history of meaning to refer to concepts in spirituality, which Christians may consider to be particular to Christianity, and not available to dissimilar or distantly foreign belief systems. While particular terms may have some functional translatability to concepts in other systems, such translations may typically be controversial outside of the forum of comparative religion. Because terms interoperate in a closed system, Christians may consider the use of such terms outside of Christianity or their particular branch (or denomination) as a distortion.

The term "Christianese" is an informal and sometimes pejorative reference to the language of terms used in Christianity as contained and, in some cases, deliberately or effectively uncooperative with secular and foreign terms. Certain denominations—contemporary Pentecostalism and Evangelicalism for example—may be more widely considered as users of distinctly localised variants of Christianese.

Some Christian commentators hold that "Christianese" is incomprehensible or off-putting to outsiders, and suggest that it is possible to express all Christian truth in neutral language, with little or no use of religious words other than "God", "Jesus" and "Bible".

Elements 
In its basic form, Christianese uses theological and/or Biblical terms to describe matters of faith and everyday experiences as interpreted through a filter of faith and doctrine. The words and phrases used are known to the speaker of the wider language (e. g. English); however, without an understanding of the passage of Bible, issue of theology or (sometimes) specific doctrine at the forefront of the mind of the speaker, the listener has no context to understand what is being said.  For example, a phrase like, "Washed in the blood" in Christianese means "My sins are forgiven because I believe in the terms of salvation as defined by Jesus."  However, without an understanding of Jesus, what he did, or what his actions mean in the Christian theology of the speaker, such statements are not understood by the listener or listeners.

Sometimes traditional language remains in use down through generations when language usage generally has moved on. For example, "Laid aside on a bed of sickness" can be used instead of "ill"; "traveling mercies" instead of "safety on your journey". This form of jargon is not fundamentally based in Bible texts but in tradition.

Special lexicography

There is a standard Christian lexicon within the Catholic Church; given that Catholic terminology is dictated by the authority of the Holy See, there is a great deal more uniformity within its literature.  For example, when a non-denominational Protestant refers to the End Times, he or she may be referring to the period following the Incarnation, as Catholics believe, or any number of eschatological interpretations of the Book of Revelation, the Olivet discourse or The Sheep and the Goats.  There are other "authoritative" lexicons within other Christian sects, but these lexicons are considerably less standard.

Criticism among Christians
Some Christians view some or all of these terms as clichés. The belief that Christianese has hindered the communication of the Christian message to the rest of the world has led some Christian writers to advocate the conscious removal of Christianese from believers' conversations and writing.  Many have also come up with alternative terms and phrases that are theoretically more "religion-neutral".  While the effectiveness of this strategy is undetermined, there is a feeling among some Christian communicators that this may be simply creating a condensed form of Christianese but failing to address the underlying issue of contextual understanding.

Christianese in popular culture
The appearance of Christianese in popular culture generally occurs in two forms: when it is actually used by writers to communicate (whether they are aware of it or not), or in parodical or satirical contexts.

Probably the most noticeable use of Christianese as satire is in The Simpsons character of Ned Flanders and his sons Rod and Tod. Though Ned's speaking style is littered with nonsensical phrases (like hi-diddly-ho) which are not related to Christianese, Ned also employs Christianese terms. For example, in the episode where Homer Simpson floods Springfield as a conceptual art project, Ned looks out his window and exclaims: "It's a miracle. The Lord has drowned the wicked and spared the righteous!". Rod and Tod show a quality of Christianese in the games that they play, such as The Good Samaritan, Clothe the Leper and Build the Mission.

Books and movies which engage Christianese as a literary style are commonly found in the Christian market. Arguably the most notable of these (and, indeed, most popular) are the Left Behind series by Tim LaHaye and Jerry B. Jenkins. This book series (currently made up of thirteen installments) is deeply rooted in dispensationalist theology and could be said to be written in Christianese (books eleven and twelve perhaps more so than the rest of the series). When the first three installments were adapted into motion pictures by the Christian film company Cloud Ten Pictures, the Christianese style of writing was folded into the dialogue, offering a clear example of Christianese in speech.

See also
Lark News, Christian satirical newsletter, employing heavy Christianese for comedic effect
Metaphorical language

External links
 Dictionary of Christianese, by Tim Stewart.
 Christianese: "Low" Church Jargon in Contemporary North America, a paper by Amanda Baker, submitted for ENG6362F: History & Structure of the English language II, Department of English, Dr. Percy, University of Toronto, Toronto, Canada, 2005.
 Christianese translator @ Christianrecovery.com, Authorization Required, login: User name, Password.
 The Language of Planet Zion at ChristianityToday.com
 No More Christianese MP3 Download at DougAddison.com
 Christianese Relationship Cliches at RelevantMagazine.com

References 

 Word Spy entry for 'Christianese'
 The Gospel According to the Simpsons by Mark I. Pinsky. Published by Westminster John Knox Press, Louisville. 2001.

Christian terminology

de:Sprache Kanaans
nl:Tale Kanaäns